Events from the year 1890 in China.

Incumbents
 Guangxu Emperor (17th year)
 Regent: Empress Dowager Cixi

Events
 February 17 - The British steamship Duburg is wrecked in the South China Sea: 400 lives are lost
 December 27 - The British steamship Shanghai burns in the East China Sea off the coast of Anhui Province; 101 lives are lost.

Births

 Taixu, Chinese Buddhist activist
 Lee Sun Chau
 Lü Ronghuan
 Wang Xugao
 Chen Yinke
 Chen Jitang
 Men Bingyue

Deaths 

 Pan Zuyin
 Lai Afong
 Zeng Guoquan
 Zeng Jize

 
Years of the 19th century in China